Thunder Levin is an American screenwriter and director, most famous for writing the first four Sharknado films. Levin's work was largely responsible for the resurgence of sharksploitation films.

Background
Levin was born and raised in New York City. His father Michael was an award-winning journalist, while his mother Glenis was an immigrant from Liverpool, England.

Levin graduated from Hunter College High School, and received his BFA in Film from NYU.

Early career
Levin moved to Los Angeles at the age of 23. In the late 1980s he worked as a still photographer on three movies for the legendary film producer Roger Corman.

Levin's feature-film directorial debut was the 2008 horror comedy Mutant Vampire Zombies from the 'Hood! starring C. Thomas Howell. Levin subsequently wrote and directed multiple films for production company The Asylum, including the 2012 science-fiction action film American Warships and the 2013 sci-fi film AE: Apocalypse Earth.

Sharknado

In 2013, Levin wrote the made-for-television disaster film Sharknado, about a tornado of shark-infested seawater. The film's debut on SyFy attracted nearly 1.37 million viewers and generated nearly 5,000 tweets a minute at its peak. In 2014 Levin penned a sequel, Sharknado 2: The Second One, which pulled in 3.9 million viewers. Levin subsequently wrote two more sequels, 2015's Sharknado 3: Oh Hell No! and 2016's Sharknado: The 4th Awakens. Sharknado became a pop culture phenomenon, ultimately spawning five sequels, a video game, a book, a one-shot comic book, a documentary, and a mockumentary.

Levin insists there is a scientific basis for the "sharknado" phenomenon.

Filmography

References

External links

American screenwriters
American directors
Living people
Year of birth missing (living people)